Marco Antônio Miranda Filho (born 11 November 1984), or simply Marco Antônio, is a Brazilian professional footballer who plays as a central midfielder for Figueirense FC.

Honours

Club
Náutico
Campeonato Pernambucano: 2004

São Paulo
Campeonato Paulista: 2005
Copa Libertadores de América: 2005

Sport
Campeonato Pernambucano: 2006

Vitória
Campeonato Baiano: 2008

Portuguesa
Campeonato Brasileiro Série B: 2011

External links

1984 births
Living people
Brazilian footballers
São Paulo FC players
Clube Náutico Capibaribe players
Associação Portuguesa de Desportos players
Grêmio Foot-Ball Porto Alegrense players
Club Athletico Paranaense players
Figueirense FC players
Al-Khor SC players
Campeonato Brasileiro Série A players
Campeonato Brasileiro Série B players
Qatar Stars League players
Association football midfielders
Footballers from São Paulo